POLB may refer to:

 DNA polymerase beta, human enzyme
 DNA polymerase II, bacterial enzyme
 Port of Long Beach